ML Royalties LP (doing business as Mr. Lube) is a Canadian chain of automotive service centres, specializing in oil changes and other scheduled maintenance. It was founded in 1976 by Clifford Giese, who opened its first location in Edmonton, Alberta. Mr. Lube is the largest quick oil chain in Canada.

The company is owned by Clifford Giese, controlling shareholder of Mr. Lube.

History
Clifford Giese and his father Arnold realized there had to be a quicker, more convenient way to get an oil change than having to make an appointment with a garage or dealership. 

In 1976, they opened the first Mr. Lube location in Edmonton and by 1984 they initiated a franchise program, thus entering a period of major expansion. 

Mr. Lube has since become one of Canada's largest quick lube brand with approximately 170 locations in all provinces except Prince Edward Island.

Mr. Lube Foundation
Since 2002, the Mr. Lube charitable foundation has distributed funds to a number of causes, most notably multiple sclerosis. In 2010, the foundation gave more than $160,000 to charities.

References

External links
Official Website
How To Detail A Car
Information About Cars

Automotive repair shops
Automotive companies of Canada
Retail companies established in 1976
1976 establishments in Alberta
Canadian brands